The Turkish National Police Academy is a public institution of higher education in Ankara, Turkey dedicated to the training of police officers. It was founded in 1937 and has offered a four-year undergraduate program since 1984.

History
The police academy was founded on 6 November 1937 in accordance with Article 18 of the Act 3201 as a one-year-in service-training institute of higher education to educate and train junior and senior executive constables.

The Police Training Institute was the first higher education institution offering a two-year training program designed in line with the resolutions of the Education and Training Council of the Ministry of National Education in 1940. Later, the institution was included in the higher education league of schools offering a three-year education program in 1962, and from 1984 onwards, it started to offer a four-year undergraduate program.

In compliance with the Constitution (Article 132) and Higher Education Law (Article 2), the institution gained a different legislative identity and was entitled The National Police Academy offering a four-year undergraduate program upon the enactment of Police Higher Education Act No.3087 issued on 6 December 1984.

With a new concept of Police University in mind, the Police Academy was restructured within the scope of Police Higher Education Act 4652 issued on 25 April 2001 to gain a university status by including the Faculty of Security Sciences, the Institute of Security Sciences, Police Vocational Schools of Higher Education, and Faculty and Higher Education Institutions offering the training programs concerned.

Of all the schools, previously operating as Police Training Schools to meet the needs of the Police Organization for police officers, twenty were transformed into Police Vocational Schools of Higher Education in line with the resolutions of the Council of Ministers enacted on 6 October 2004 in the issue of the Official Gazette no. 24545, and the other five subsequently went through the same process in compliance with the resolutions of the Council of Ministers enacted on 9 August in the issue of the Official Gazette no. 25239.

In 2002, the foundation of the Institute of Security Sciences was fully completed to admit students upon the approval of The Council of Higher Education on 18 March 2002. In the Institute, there are six academic divisions: (1) International Terrorism, (2) International Security, (3) Criminal Justice, (4) Crime Researches, (5) Transportation Security, (6) Security Strategies Administration. There are currently some 750 MA and PhD students. The Institute also offers PhD programs to train academic personnel to meet the needs of the faculty and vocational higher education schools.

Goals
The goal of the Police Academy is to train officers, constables and chief constables for the police, to offer a two-year course, undergraduate and graduate programs conferring a two-year degree, bachelor's degree and master's degree respectively in the fields concerned, to conduct scientific researches, and to publish in the fields of interest.

Training and education programs

Associate degree in policing
The associate degree in policing program is a two-year academic study offering a two-year university degree to the future police officers at the entry level rank in Turkish National Police Organization.

Undergraduate program: B.A. in Security Sciences
The College of Security Sciences offers a B.A. degree in security sciences. Cadets with foreign nationality follow a one-year Turkish as a Second Language program to learn Turkish besides the entry level courses from the B.A. program. There are cadets from 20 different countries study policing and security sciences at the B.A. in Security Sciences Program.

Graduate program 
The Institute of Security Sciences offers a two-year postgraduate study, composed of four semesters: two semesters for classes and two semesters for thesis writing in the fields of interest concerned.

Ph.D. program
The Institute of Security Sciences offers a four-year Ph.D. program, composed of eight semesters: two semesters for classes and six semesters for thesis writing for the degree of philosophy of police studies.

Faculty and Higher Education Institutions program
This program, included in the Police Academy curriculum as part of the whole education and training program, is designed to admit students from those already enrolled as regular students in different faculties of state universities in Ankara. They are trained as cadets while they pursue their studies in the special fields in which the police organization feels the need for the qualified personnel.

Management program
As part of the education and training program of the Institute of Security Sciences, this program is designed for 3rd degree superintendents who display satisfactory performance in the tests of promotion in order to be trained as Senior Chief Constables of High Rank, and also for constables to be trained as Junior Executive Constables.

Source of students

College of Security Sciences
Students from three sources are accepted to the College of Security Sciences: Police High School graduates, graduates from other high schools in Turkey and cadets from foreign countries. Currently, there is only one B.A. program within the College: B.A. in Security Sciences. High school graduates who obtain a high score from the university entrance exam take highly competitive written, verbal, and physical tests to be admitted to the PVSHEs as police cadets. Only 1/1000 of the applicants are accepted to the program. Graduates of this program begin their policing career in TNP at the rank of sergeant.

Institute of Security Sciences
The students who follow the postgraduate program are those who have already completed their undergraduate education at the Police Academy, military schools, universities if educated on behalf of the General Directorate of Security and other institutions of higher education (Faculty of Law, Faculty of Political Sciences, and Faulty of Finance and Administrative Studies).

FYO (Faculty and Institutions of Higher Education)
Graduates of Police College, high schools, technical schools for boys, technical schools for girls, commerce and tourism high schools, form the source of the students of Faculty and Institutions of Higher Education. The students to be educated on behalf of the General Directorate of Security are selected on the basis of selection requirements specified by the directorate concerned each year from those already enrolled in the first year, second year and third year of the programs of the faculties operating in the province where the Police Academy is situated.

Police Vocational Schools of Higher Education
There are 28 Police Vocational Schools of Higher Education (PVSHE) across the country. PVSHEs are the remote campuses of Turkish National Police Academy to offer associate degree in policing program. High school graduates who obtain a certain amount of score from the university entrance exam take rigorous written, verbal, and physical tests to be admitted to the PVSHEs as police cadets. Graduates of this program begin their policing career in TNP at the entry level rank.

Duration of education
The whole undergraduate program of the faculty of Security Sciences is a four-year degree course designed on the basis of satisfactory completion of two semesters for each academic year with one-academic year optional study allocated for those who have not completed their studies satisfactorily within the duration required. The cadets thought to be unable to complete the program within five-year-duration of study are declared ‘school dropout’ irrespective of their academic year level.

Pre-Service training
After a successful academic study all year round and summer training program, the student must complete pre-service training by going through a program for a month as described below.

Summer training camps
Upon completion of their studies during their first and second academic years, the cadets go through a summer training program at Didim Training Camp for a month or two. The cadets are trained in shooting skills, put their theoretical knowledge into practice, develop their physical strength and practice first aid. Those whose performances in the end-of-camp tests are 'unsatisfactory' will take the same test the next year.

Source of students
The Police College is a boarding state high school whose graduates are all academy-bound and are admitted to The Faculty of Security Sciences. Apart from College graduates, high school graduates, vocational high school graduates and students from abroad may apply for the undergraduate program of the faculty.

Students from abroad 
Students from abroad are allowed to apply provided that the Ministry of Interior approves. The students from abroad will be given a Turkish proficiency test, and if they have adequate command of Turkish to follow the program, they will be enrolled. There are cadets from many foreign countries at TNPA. These countries are:

Albania, Bosnia-Herzegovina, Macedonia, Kosovo, Moldavia, Georgia, Azerbaijan, Kyrgyzstan, Turkmenistan, Kazakhstan, Mongolia, Jordan, Palestine, United Arab Emirates, Yemen, Turkish Republic of Northern Cyprus, Somali, Sudan, Ethiopia, Libya.

Socrates/Erasmus
The Police Academy is involved in EU Education and Youth Programs and holds Erasmus University Charter-EUC. The Academy has signed mutual agreements with the higher education institutions to exchange students and staff members within the scope of Socrates/Erasmus Program. The above-mentioned institutions are:

 General Jonas Zemaitis Military Academy, Lithuania
 Police Academy, Czech Republic
 Faculty of Criminal Justice and Security, University of Maribor, Slovenia
 University of Salford, England
 Lyon 3 University

Three students from the Faculty of Criminal Justice of Maribor University came to the Police Academy on a student—exchange program in 2005-2006 academic year to follow the program for one semester. Within the same academic year two Lithuanian postgraduate students came to the Institute of Security Sciences to do some research for their master's thesis.

Three Police Academy Cadets of the Faculty of Security Sciences went to Maribor University to follow the undergraduate program of the Faculty of Criminal Justice for one semester.

Some staff members of the universities in Lithuania, England and Slovenia came to the Police Academy as visiting scholars to lecture for a period of time, and staff members of the Faculty of Security Sciences went to those countries to teach for the same period of time.

Bologna process
The academy has already completed the process of transforming into the EU credit transfer system and enclosing a transcript of credits with the diploma conferred.

Promotion prospects
The graduates of the Faculty of Security Sciences will be appointed to work at various departments in the National Security Organization as an assistant commissar, a police officer in the administrative section of the police force. They have the opportunity to be promoted to hold the highest rank in the organization. They also benefit a lot from a wide range of opportunities that the organization offers such as housing provided free of charge for the whole family, summer or winter resorts run by the organization, houses of police operating nationwide, health—care provided for all the members of the family. They are also endowed with the opportunity to follow language programs abroad, in-service training programs designed abroad and foreign mission to be completed in embassies abroad for a certain period of time.

Life in the faculty
The Faculty of Security Sciences has a campus situated on a  site in Gölbaşı, a small town 25 km from Ankara. In addition to the lecture halls, there are also simulation rooms designed for traffic and forensic science courses for the students to follow and take part in them while learning how to investigate the scene of the accident or the crime committed. Its main campus (smaller in size) is in Anittepe, where the Institute of Security Sciences operates and runs its own programs.

The library has 25,000 books and periodicals for the students, personnel and researchers. There is a language lab with computer assisted programs backed up with sound track for listening practice and viewing audio-visual materials.

The conference hall, holding 750 people, serves for viewing movies, organizing symposia and panel discussions besides recreational activities produced and directed by the students.

There are four cafeterias, one for each academic year—freshmen, sophomores, juniors and seniors. Each academic year student group has its own living quarters on the campus.

Golbasi Campus has three dining halls: students' hall for 1150, a smaller one for 100 people available for the staff only and a VIP hall for guests.

On Anittepe campus there is a dining hall for 400 students and an open-air cafeteria-like restaurant open to the students, the personnel and the public. On Anittepe Campus there is a nine-storey dormitory for the students studying at other universities on behalf of the Police Academy. On Golbasi Campus are there two men's dormitories accommodating 1500 students and a 120—student dormitory for women students.

The Golbasi campus has a post office, three barbers, three tailors and two shoe-repairers employed to meet the daily needs of the cadets and also the personnel.

Golbasi campus can be reached by the service buses departing from the Anittepe Campus in the city centre. Also the public buses can be used to reach Golbasi departing from the Sihhiye and Ulus centers.

Academy TV
Academy TV is a close-circuit broadcasting channel, transmitting education, daily news and a magazine.

Sports activities
The sports complex has an area of 86,000 square meters, consisting of facilities such as three covered sports halls, two small-sized football fields with a synthetic special floor, one tennis court, one mini golf court, three basketball, five volleyball and beach volleyball fields, three saunas and one athletics field. In addition to these, there is one sports hall, fitness center, and a small-sized football field on Anittepe Campus for physical education and self-defense courses to be done.

The cadets are trained in shooting with firearms and with air pistols. The shooting facilities are equipped with scenario—based standard immobilized swivel target, mobilized swivel target and a standard one.

Six hundred students enjoy sports ranging from athletics to table tennis. In the 2001-2002 season, 22 cadets were chosen to be on the National Team in shooting, cross racing, ice hockey, karate, skiing, judo and taekwondo.

Social clubs
 Training and Self-development
 Software Programming and Development
 Communication and Media
 Press and Publishing
 Academy TV
 Language Training Centre
 Atam Group
 Theatre, Music and Cinema
 Billiards Sports Group
 Eurasia Group
 Environmental Issues
 Poets Society
 Special Project Group
 Police Academy Scientific Research Club
 Turkish Folklore Group
 EU Research Group
 Translation Club
 Drama Club

Publications
The Turkish Journal of Police Studies is a periodical published quarterly on police studies under the auspices of the Police Academy particularly focusing on preventing and combating crimes. Another journal is published on human rights and human rights violations as indicated by the judgments of the European Court of Human Rights. A pamphlet of daily articles of well-known columnists is also duplicated and disseminated to all cadets. Each academic year students are encouraged to prepare a newspaper composed of their writings.

References

External links
Official site

Universities and colleges in Ankara
State universities and colleges in Turkey
Law enforcement in Turkey
Police academies
Educational institutions established in 1937
1937 establishments in Turkey